Angraecum equitans is a species of flowering plant in the family Orchidaceae.
The native range of the species is Northern Madagascar. The plant is epiphytic and grows primarily in wet tropical biomes.

References

Taxa named by Rudolf Schlechter
Plants described in 1916
Flora of Madagascar
equitans